Rosario de Velasco Belausteguigoitia (Madrid, May 20, 1904 - Barcelona, March 2, 1991) Spanish painter. 
Born in Madrid, in her early years she started an active painting career. "Pupil of Fernando Álvarez de Sotomayor y Zaragoza, developed a neo-traditional style imbued with Magic Realism. Her favourite subjects were seascapes, portraits and landscapes. In 1932, she obtained second prize at the National Fine Arts Exhibition with Adam and Eve, showing a fully-clothed man and woman lying in a meadow. In 1936, she took part in the Jeu de Paume exhibition “Contemporary Spanish art. Painting and sculpture”, where she presented Carnaval". Member of the female branch of the Falange Española, she take active part in many cultural events. During the Spanish Civil War she was sentenced to death in Barcelona but she escapes with the help, among others, from his future husband, Xavier Farrerons-Co, a MD. They both got married during the war in their own house and run away to France from the Catalan-French border to re-enter again from the French-Navarra border. They live in a small town in the Burgos province. In 1938 Rosario de Velasco delivered her only child in San Sebastian, a girl called María del Mar Farrerons de Velasco. At the end of the war the 3 of them return to Barcelona. 

In Barcelona, the painter catch up her career successfully taking part in many exhibitions. She also quits the active political activity. She will start to have solo exhibitions developing a much more personal style mostly in oil on canvas works although she made some works in fresco paintings and book illustration. 
In the late 50 she became more personal and grown and reach critic success and sales with regular solo exhibitions in Sala Gaspar (Barcelona), Sala Parés (Barcelona), Syra (Barcelona) among others. 
In the late 60 she starts to paint in oil on paper with more artistic freedom creating some of her best works. 
She dies in Barcelona in 1991 with a legacy of many works some of them in prestigious museums such as The Centre Pompidou in Paris (Carnaval, 1936) and Sketch of Mother and Son, 1936 or Museo Nacional Centro de Arte Reina Sofía (Adam and Eve, 1932). Most of her work stays in her family collections, mainly in her daughter's, María del Mar Farrerons de Velasco.
References:

Rosario de Velasco was awarded second medal for painting at the National Exhibition of Fine Arts in Madrid for Adán y Eva (Adam and Eve), done the same year. She went on to show the piece at exhibitions organized by the Society of Iberian Artists in Copenhagen between December 1932 and January 1933.

Exhibitions 

 1924: Exposición Nacional de Bellas Artes. Madrid

 1932: Exposición Nacional de Bellas Artes. Madrid

 1932: Exposición de la Sociedad de Artistas Ibéricos. Ateneo Mercantil, Valencia

 1932: Exposición de la Sociedad de Artistas Ibéricos. Statens Museum for Kunst (SMK), Copenhague

 1932: Galerie Flechtheim. Berlin

 1933: Museos Carnegie de Pittsburgh. Pittsburg, Pensilvania (EE.UU.)

 1934: Exposición Nacional de Bellas Artes. Madrid

 1935: Exposición dedicada a jóvenes artistas y poetisas. Librería Internacional. Zaragoza

 1936: Exposición Nacional de Bellas Artes. Madrid

 1936: L'art espagnol contemporain : (peinture et sculpture) : Musée des écoles étrangères contemporaines, Galerie nationale du Jeu de Paume, 12 février-mars 1936. París

 1939: Exposición Nacional de Pintura y Escultura de Valencia, organizada por la Delegación Provincial de Bellas Artes de la Falange Española. Valencia

 1940: Exposición Galerías Augusta, Barcelona. Del 28 de diciembre al 10 de enero de 1941.

 1941: Exposición Galerías de Arte. Barcelona. Del 1 al 15 de octubre. 

 1941: Exposición Nacional de Bellas Artes. Madrid

 1942: Bienal de Venecia. Obra expuesta, Adán y Eva.

 1943: Pintura y Escultura Españolas en la Sociedad Nacional de Bellas Artes de Lisboa

 1943: Galería Syra. Passeig de Gràcia 43. Barcelona

 1944: II Salón de los Once. Galería Biosca. Madrid

 1944: Casa del Libro. Del 24 de enero al 6 de febrero. Ronda de Sant Pere, 3. Barcelona

 1945: Galerías Pictoria. Caspe, 45. Barcelona

 1947: Galería Argos. 26 de abril al 9 de mayo. Passeig de Gràcia, 30. Barcelona

 1950: Exposición de Arte Español. El Cairo (Egipto)

 1951: Exposición de Arte Español Contemporáneo. Buenos Aires (Argentina)

 1952: I Bienal Hispanoamericana de Arte: Exposición Antológica Museo de Arte Moderno: Barcelona 

 1953: Galerías San Jorge (Passeig de Grácia 63, Barcelona) Del 16 al 29 de mayo

 1954: Exposición Nacional de Bellas Artes. Obra expuesta: "Chico con Perro". Palacio Velázquez, Madrid

 1955: Sala Gaspar, Consell de Cent, 323. Barcelona. Del 15 al 28 de enero

 1955: III Bienal Hispanoamericana de Arte. Palacio Municipal de Exposiciones de Barcelona. Del 4/09/1955–6/01/1956

 1956: Galería Toisón. (Arenal 5, Madrid) Desde el 1 de mayo

 1962: Salón Femenino de Arte Actual. Barcelona

 1966: Salón de mayo X Edición. Barcelona

 1968: VII Salón Femenino de Arte Actual. Sala Municipal de Arte (antigua capilla del Hospital de la Santa Cruz) Barcelona

 1971: Galería Biosca. C. Génova, 11. Madrid. Del 11 al 30 de enero

 1971: Galería Syra. Passeig de Gràcia 43. Barcelona. Del 3 al 16 de diciembre.

 1974: Galería Syra. Passeig de Gràcia 43. Barcelona. Del 8 al 21 de marzo

 1977: Sala Parés. C. Petritxol, 8. Barcelona. Del 26 de enero al 14 de febrero

 1977: Galería Syra. Passeig de Gràcia 43. Barcelona

 1977: Sala Gaspar, Barcelona

 1981: Cau de la Carreta. Sitges (Barcelona)

1983: Cau de la Carreta. Sitges (Barcelona) del 1 al 31 de octubre

 1985: Cau de la Carreta. Sitges (Barcelona) Del 4 de julio al 20 de agosto

 1988: Cau de la Carreta. Sitges (Barcelona)

 1989: Cau de la Carreta. Sitges (Barcelona) del 4 de marzo al 9 de abril

 2013: Centre Pompidou. Colectiva "Multiple Modernities 1905-1970" París

 2019: Dibujantas, pioneras de la Ilustración en el Museo ABC, Madrid. Exposición colectiva

 2020: Dibujantas. Pioneras de la Ilustración. Museo Pablo Gargallo, Zaragoza. Desde el 11-12-2029 al 8 de marzo de 2021Exposición colectiva

References

Spanish painters
Spanish women painters
Spanish landscape painters